Paul Kitson (31 May 1956 – 25 August 2005) was an English footballer who played and coached professionally with both indoor and outdoor soccer teams in Canada and the United States.

Player
Kitson began his career with Watford in England before moving to the United States.

He played in Baltimore Blasts from 1983 to 1986,  where he won two championships, before being traded to the LA Lakers. On 6 March 1987, the Los Angeles Lazers traded Kitson to the Cleveland Force for Chris Chueden. He spent the next two seasons with the Force. In 1990, he played for the New Jersey Eagles in the American Professional Soccer League.

Coach
Kitson began his coaching career with the Montreal Impact in 1997. Under his leadership the Impact it to the playoffs both seasons, but the team closed at the end of the 1998 season. On 14 May 1999, the Maryland Mania of the USL A-League hired Kitson. In 2001, Kitson was appointed the head coach for Canadian Professional Soccer League expansion side the Brampton Hitmen. Throughout the season the Hitmen performed poorly without recording a single victory, which resulted in Kitson departing from his post on 25 July 2001.

Death 
Kitson died on August 25, 2005 after collapsing from coaching a youth team.

References

External links
 Kitson Obituary
 MISL stats

1956 births
2005 deaths
Footballers from Greater London
English footballers
Association football defenders
New York Apollo players
New York United players
Chicago Horizons players
New York Arrows players
Baltimore Blast (1980–1992) players
Los Angeles Lazers players
Cleveland Force (original MISL) players
New Jersey Eagles players
Denver Thunder players
Arizona Sandsharks players
Detroit Rockers players
Philadelphia KiXX players
Detroit Neon players
Toronto Shooting Stars players
Montreal Impact (1992–2011) players
Maryland Mania players
American Professional Soccer League players
American Soccer League (1933–1983) players
Continental Indoor Soccer League players
Major Indoor Soccer League (1978–1992) players
National Professional Soccer League (1984–2001) players
A-League (1995–2004) players
English expatriate footballers
English expatriate sportspeople in the United States
English expatriate sportspeople in Canada
Expatriate soccer players in the United States
Expatriate soccer players in Canada
English football managers
Montreal Impact (1992–2011) coaches
National Professional Soccer League (1984–2001) coaches
USL First Division coaches
Canadian Soccer League (1998–present) managers
English expatriate football managers
Expatriate soccer managers in Canada
Expatriate soccer managers in the United States
English emigrants to the United States